The men's featherweight (57 kg/125.4 lbs) Low-Kick category at the W.A.K.O. World Championships 2007 in Belgrade was the third lightest of the male Low-Kick tournaments involving twelve fighters from three continents (Europe, Asia and Africa).  Each of the matches was three rounds of two minutes each and were fought under Low-Kick rules.

As there were too few competitors for a sixteen-man tournament, four of the fighters had byes through to the quarter finals.  The tournament winner was Dzmitry Varatis from Belarus who defeated Serbian Boban Marinkovic in the final to win gold.  Semi-finalists Elnur Salamov from Azerbaijan and Russian Umar Paskhaev received bronze medals.

Results

Key

See also
List of WAKO Amateur World Championships
List of WAKO Amateur European Championships
List of male kickboxers

References

External links
 WAKO World Association of Kickboxing Organizations Official Site

Kickboxing events at the WAKO World Championships 2007 Belgrade
2007 in kickboxing
Kickboxing in Serbia